Jelle Maas (born 19 February 1991) is a Dutch retired badminton player specializing in doubles events. He was the bronze medalists at the 2018 European Championships and 2019 European Games. Badminton Nederland announced his retirement from the international tours on 22 July 2020, and officially left the national training center on 1 September 2020.

Achievements

European Games 
Men's doubles

European Championships 
Men's doubles

BWF World Tour 
The BWF World Tour, which was announced on 19 March 2017 and implemented in 2018, is a series of elite badminton tournaments sanctioned by the Badminton World Federation (BWF). The BWF World Tour is divided into levels of World Tour Finals, Super 1000, Super 750, Super 500, Super 300, and the BWF Tour Super 100.

Men's doubles

BWF Grand Prix 
The BWF Grand Prix had two levels, the Grand Prix and Grand Prix Gold. It was a series of badminton tournaments sanctioned by the Badminton World Federation (BWF) and played between 2007 and 2017.

Men's doubles

  BWF Grand Prix Gold tournament
  BWF Grand Prix tournament

BWF International Challenge/Series 
Men's doubles

Mixed doubles

  BWF International Challenge tournament
  BWF International Series tournament
  BWF Future Series tournament

References

External links 
 

1991 births
Living people
People from Oosterhout
Sportspeople from North Brabant
Dutch male badminton players
Badminton players at the 2019 European Games
European Games bronze medalists for the Netherlands
European Games medalists in badminton
21st-century Dutch people